Murray v Leisureplay plc [2005] EWCA Civ 963 is an English contract law case, concerning the termination of an agreement and penalty clauses.

Facts
An employment contract said ‘in the event of wrongful termination by way of liquidated damages the company shall forthwith pay to the Executive a sum equal to one year’s gross salary, pension contributions and other benefits in kind.’ Leisureplay plc claimed that the bonus should be void as a penalty clause.

In the High Court, Burnton J held it was penal because no account was taken of the Executive’s duty to mitigate his loss.

Judgment
The Court of Appeal held that the bonus was valid. Arden LJ held the clause was ‘generous’ but still liquidated damages, as it was not ‘extravagant or unconscionable’.

See also

English contract law

Notes

References

English contract case law
2005 in British law
2005 in case law
Court of Appeal (England and Wales) cases